The Battle of Balkh took place between the armies of the Samanid Empire under the command of Emir Isma'il ibn Ahmad and Saffarid forces under Emir Amr ibn al-Layth in 900. The Saffarid army was defeated by the Samanid forces, and Amr ibn al-Layth was captured.

The Samanid ruler, Isma'il ibn Ahmad, was sent him in chains to Baghdad, where he was executed in 902, after al-Mu'tadid's death

After the Battle, the Saffarids lost Khorasan and were left with the control of Fars, Kerman and Sistan, but they also lost these provinces after a civil war by 912.

References 

900
Balkh
Medieval Afghanistan
Balkh
9th century in Asia
Battles involving the Samanid dynasty